"Seven Lonely Days" is a song written by Earl Shuman, Alden Shuman, and Marshall Brown. It was originally recorded by American singer Georgia Gibbs with orchestra conducted by Glenn Osser and the Yale Bros. choir in December 1952 and released in January 1953, peaking at number 5 in the US chart.

The song was later performed by The Pinetoppers And The Marlin Sisters, Bonnie Lou, The Crows with Viola Watkins, Gisele MacKenzie, Ivo Robić, Kitty Wells, The Teddy Bears, Patsy Cline, The Migil 5, Wanda Jackson, Dave Dudley, Dan Folger, Jean Shepard, Owen Gray, Lynn Anderson, Debbie, Fred Stuger, Sheila & B.Devotion, Mario Cavallero et son orchestre (with Karine Miet), Kristi Rose and the Midnight Walkers, k d lang, Kelly Willis, Petty Booka, Kirsten Siggaard, Smoking Popes, The Ranch Girls & Their Ragtime Wranglers, Wenche Hartmann, Cowslingers, and Marti Brom. The melody is the basis for the popular Chinese song "Give Me a Kiss" (给我一个吻).

Original chart performance

Bonnie Lou version

Country music and rock and roll singer Bonnie Lou released the song as a single in March 1953. It peaked at number 7 on the Billboard Magazine Most Played C&W in Juke Boxes chart and was later included on her 1958 album, Bonnie Lou Sings.

Chart performance

Gisele MacKenzie version

Canadian singer Gisele MacKenzie performed her own version of Seven Lonely Days in July 1953. It reached the sixth place in the UK Singles Chart.

Chart performance

Jean Shepard version 

In 1969, Jean Shepard released a version from her album Seven Lonely Days. It was her first single to become a major hit since 1967's "Your Forevers Don't Last Very Long". Shepard's versions reached number 18 on the Billboard Magazine Hot Country Singles chart and number 34 on the RPM Country Singles chart.

Chart performance

References 

1953 singles
Bonnie Lou songs
Jean Shepard songs
Songs with lyrics by Earl Shuman
1953 songs
Mercury Records singles
King Records (United States) singles
Capitol Records singles
1969 singles
Sheila (singer) songs